Sam Greenwood may refer to:

 Sam Greenwood (poker player) (born 1988), Canadian professional poker player
 Sam Greenwood (footballer) (born 2002), English footballer